The Dhivehi Rayyithunge Party (DRP) is a political party of the Maldives. On 2 June 2005, the nation’s 50-member parliament voted unanimously to allow and operate political parties in Maldives. DRP subsequently submitted its registration on 21 July 2005 and was the second registered political party in the second Republic of the Maldives.

DRP has the third largest number of members among all political parties in the Maldives.

History

Maumoon Abdul Gayyoom (2005–2010)
On 2 June 2005, the nation’s 50-member parliament voted unanimously to allow and operate political parties in the Maldives. DRP subsequently submitted its registration on 21 July 2005 and was the second registered political party in the second republic of the Maldives.

At the first multi-party parliamentary elections in the Maldives on 9 May 2009, the DRP won 36% of the seats (28 out of 77 seats) in the parliament, becoming the party to win the most seats. However, DRP gained the second most votes with 27.5% of the votes (39,399 votes) compared with the 35.3% of votes (50,562 votes) gained by the Maldivian Democratic Party

Ahmed Thasmeen Ali (2010–2013)

In 2011, the first leader of the party, former president Maumoon Abdul Gayoom removed himself from the party amid contentious conflicts of interest within the party and political competitiveness. He formed a new political party called the Progressive Party of Maldives (PPM). It was a point where DRP had a huge debt following the defeat in the 2008 Presidential Elections with Ahmed Thasmeen Ali as the running mate of Gayyoom. Once Gayyoom left, the party was led by Ahmed Thasmeen Ali who had to face the inherited debt of 32 Million Rufiyaa. This was the biggest challenge for him as the leader of the party. Following the defeat in the first round of Presidential Elections 2013, Thasmeen Ali being the running mate of former president Dr. Waheed, DRP decided to support MDP in the second round of the elections, disappointing a lot of members of the party. MDP was defeated in the second round by PPM. Ahmed Thasmeen Ali then decided to join MDP, leaving DRP in the hands of the current leader Mohamed Nasheed (Colonel), who courageously took up the place of duty, when two leaders on two occasions, had left the party to perish. Taking up the leadership, Mohamed Nasheed promised reform and recovery in many aspects of the party. He had stated that the party was in ICU at the moment, as audited and unaudited debt of the party would round up to a figure as big as 10 Million Rufiyaa.

Mohamed Nasheed (Colonel) (2013–2019)

The current leader of DRP is Abdulla Jabir.  He became the leader of the Party on 18 November 2013, after receiving majority of the votes at the 142nd council meeting.

Soon after taking up the leadership, Mohamed Nasheed, as a determined leader, announced a logo contest open for all, to change the logo of the party. It was part of the re-branding and reforming of DRP. The logo to win the 1st place was “Rising Star” designed by Modern Arts. The logo was inspired from a verse of a poem by Muhammad Jameel Didi who was a famous poet and a political figure of the Maldives.

Currently, the Dhivehi Rayyithunge Party holds one seat in the parliament. Party congress was scheduled to be held in August this year, in accordance with the decision by the council of DRP.

Party's Objectives
According to the party's literature, The objectives of DRP are:

Strengthening and protecting the existing bonds of Islamic unity.
Grooming a new generation of well-disciplined and talented youths who will carry the mantle of national progress, in the years ahead.
Upholding justice.
Modeling the Maldivian society to reflect the aspirations of the people.
Protecting the Maldives from detrimental external influences.
Facilitating easy access to basic services such as housing, education and healthcare for every citizen.
Introducing a new generation of youthful leaders with the vision to fashion domestic affairs in an atmosphere of peace and harmony.
Creating a service-oriented population working steadfastly to promote the well being of the people.

Election Results

President

People's Majlis

References

External links
 https://web.archive.org/web/20120324173118/http://www.drp.mv/ - Official website

Political parties established in 2005
2005 establishments in the Maldives
Islamic political parties in the Maldives